Faulknor may refer to:

In people: 
 Faulknor family, an English family of distinguished Royal Navy officers, including:
 Jonathan Faulknor the elder
 Robert Faulknor the younger (1763-1795)
 Christopher Faulknor (born 1962), Jamaican sprinter
 Kennedy Faulknor (born 1999), Canadian soccer player

In ships: 
 Faulknor class leader, a class of British flotilla leaders named after the Faulknor family
 HMS Faulknor, two destroyers named after the Faulknor family

See also 
 Falconer (disambiguation)
 Falkner (disambiguation)
 Faulkner (disambiguation)
 Fawkner (disambiguation)
Faulconer (surname)